Loredana Boboc (born 12 May 1984 in Bucharest, Romania) is a retired  Romanian artistic gymnast. She represented Romania at the 2000 Summer Olympics and won a gold medal with her team. She was a member of the gold medal winning teams at the 1999 and 2001 World Championships.

Later in life she appeared in an episode of the TV series lubire ca in filme.

References

1984 births
Living people
Gymnasts from Bucharest
Romanian female artistic gymnasts
Gymnasts at the 2000 Summer Olympics
Olympic gymnasts of Romania
Olympic gold medalists for Romania
Medalists at the World Artistic Gymnastics Championships
Olympic medalists in gymnastics
Medalists at the 2000 Summer Olympics
20th-century Romanian women
21st-century Romanian women